Baldassare is a masculine Italian given name. Notable people with the name include:

 Baldassare Aloisi (1578–1638), Italian history and portrait painter and engraver
 Baldassare Bianchi (1612–1679), Italian painter
 Baldassare Castiglione (1478–1529), Italian Renaissance writer
 Baldassare Cittadella (1603–1651), Italian Jesuit
 Baldassare Croce (1558–1628), Italian painter
 Baldassare d'Anna (circa 1560–1600), Italian painter
 Baldassare Di Maggio (born 1954), Sicilian Mafioso
 Baldassare Donato (circa 1525–1603), Italian composer and singer
 Baldassare Ferri (1610–1680), Italian singer
 Baldassare Forestiere (1879–1946), Italian-American founder of the Forestiere Underground Gardens
 Baldassare Franceschini (1611–1689), Italian Baroque painter
 Baldassare Gabbugiani (18th century), Italian engraver
 Baldassare Galuppi (1706-1785), Venetian composer
 Baldassare Peruzzi (1481–1537), Italian architect and painter
 Baldassare Verazzi (1819–1886), Italian painter

Italian masculine given names